Batasingaram is a village in Ranga Reddy district in Telangana, India. It falls under Abdullapur mandal. It is very close to the Outer Ring Road, Hyderabad.

Batasingaram Logistic park
The Batasingaram Logistic Park, an inter-city truck terminal, would be coming up on a 40-acre site few km from Outer Ring Road (ORR) towards Vijayawada at an estimated cost of Rs.35crore.Along with logistic park it has gaddianaram fruit market in the same park it is the largest fruit market in india

References

Villages in Ranga Reddy district